Dag Rune Olsen (born 12 February 1962, in Røros) is a Norwegian cancer researcher, professor of biomedical physics at the University of Bergen, and the current rector of the University of Tromsø, where he was hired in 2021. He was the elected rector of the University of Bergen from 2013-2020.

Academic career
In April 2013, Dag Rune Olsen was elected the new rector of the University of Bergen with 59% of the votes. He took over the position from Sigmund Grønmo on August 1, 2013. In his campaign he emphasized the importance of developing the university further as an international research university. He has also been the dean at the Faculty of Mathematics and Natural Sciences (2010–2013).

Before coming to Bergen, he was working at the Institute of Cancer Research at the Oslo University Hospital. He obtained his PhD in medical physics from the University of Oslo in 1999.

References

External links
 Home page at the University of Bergen
 Publications registered at www.cristin.no

Living people
University of Oslo alumni
Academic staff of the University of Bergen
Rectors of the University of Bergen
People from Røros
1962 births